Heihachi Jaya is one of the oldest restaurants in Japan, founded in 1576, and located on the bank of Takano River in Kyoto city, Kyoto Prefecture.

The restaurant was included in famous literary works and Kyogens, traditional comical theatre plays.

See also 
List of oldest companies

References

External links 
Homepage

Restaurants in Japan
Hotels in Japan
Companies based in Kyoto
Companies established in the 16th century
16th-century establishments in Japan